Mbenga may refer to:

Fish
Hydrocynus goliath (Goliath Tigerfish)

Polyps 
 Phialucium mbenga

People
 Mbenga people, western Pygmies

Individuals
 Choro Mbenga, Gambian association footballer and manager
 D. J. Mbenga, a Belgian professional basketball player
 Musa Mbenga, Gambian politician
 Urbain Mbenga, leader in the Community of Christ

Disambiguation pages with surname-holder lists